The Proboscidea are a taxonomic order of afrotherian mammals containing one living family (Elephantidae) and several extinct families. First described by J. Illiger in 1811, it encompasses the elephants and their close relatives. From the mid-Miocene onwards, most proboscideans were very large. In addition to their enormous size, later proboscideans are distinguished by tusks and long, muscular trunks, which were less developed or absent in early proboscideans.

Three species of elephant are currently recognised: the African bush elephant, the African forest elephant, and the Asian elephant. Elephantidae is the only surviving family of the order Proboscidea; extinct members include the mastodons, gomphotheres and stegodonts. The family Elephantidae also contains several extinct groups, including the mammoths and straight-tusked elephants. The distinctive features of proboscideans include a trunk, tusks, and massive legs. Large ear flaps are present in some proboscideans, including elephants. Some also have tough but sensitive skin; others, like the woolly mammoth, have a coat. The trunk is used for breathing, bringing food and water to the mouth, and grasping objects. Tusks, which are derived from the incisor teeth, serve both as weapons and as tools for moving objects and digging. The large ear flaps assist in maintaining a constant body temperature as well as in communication. The pillar-like legs carry their great weight.

Evolution
The earliest known proboscidean is Eritherium, followed by Phosphatherium, a small animal about the size of a fox. Both date from late Paleocene deposits of Morocco.

Proboscideans evolved in Africa, where they increased in size and diversity during the Eocene and early Oligocene. Proboscideans have evolved greatly over time through three major forms of radiation: radiation of primitive Lophodont forms, radiation of gomphotheres and stegodons, and radiation of elephantidae. These forms of radiation have illustrated that proboscideans characteristics such as trunk, large ears, and tusks have evolved and were appearing late in the modern form. Several primitive families from these epochs have been described, including the Numidotheriidae, Moeritheriidae, and Barytheriidae, all found exclusively in Africa. The Anthracobunidae from the Indian subcontinent were also believed to be a family of proboscideans, but were excluded from the Proboscidea by Shoshani and Tassy (2005) and have more recently been assigned to the Perissodactyla. When Africa became connected to Europe and Asia after the shrinking of the Tethys Sea, proboscideans migrated into Eurasia, with some families eventually reaching the Americas. Proboscideans found in Eurasia as well as Africa include the Deinotheriidae, which thrived during the Miocene and into the early Quaternary, Stegolophodon, an early genus of the disputed family Stegodontidae; the highly diverse Gomphotheriidae and Amebelodontidae; and the Mammutidae, or mastodons.

Most proboscideans are now extinct, including all species endemic to the Americas, Europe, and northern Asia. Many of these extinctions occurred during or shortly after the last glacial period. Recently extinct species include the gomphotheres in the Americas, the American mastodon of family Mammutidae in North America, numerous stegodonts in Asia, the mammoths throughout the Northern Hemisphere, and several species of dwarf elephants found on various islands scattered around the world.

Classification
Below is an unranked taxonomy of proboscidean genera as of 2019.

Proboscidea Illiger, 1811
†Eritherium Gheerbrant, 2009
†Moeritherium Andrews, 1901
†Saloumia Tabuce et al., 2019
†Plesielephantiformes Shoshani et al., 2001
†Numidotheriidae Shoshani & Tassy, 1992
†Phosphatherium Gheerbrant et al., 1996
†Arcanotherium Delmer, 2009
†Daouitherium Gheerbrant & Sudre, 2002
†Numidotherium Mahboubi et al., 1986
†Barytheriidae Andrews, 1906
†Omanitherium Seiffert et al., 2012
†Barytherium Andrews, 1901
†Deinotheriidae Bonaparte, 1845
†Chilgatherium Sanders et al., 2004
†Prodeinotherium Ehik, 1930
†Deinotherium Kaup, 1829
Elephantiformes Tassy, 1988
†Eritreum Shoshani et al., 2006
†Hemimastodon Pilgrim, 1912
†Palaeomastodon Andrews, 1901
†Phiomia Andrews & Beadnell, 1902
Elephantimorpha Tassy & Shoshani, 1997
†Mammutidae Hay, 1922
†Losodokodon Rasmussen & Gutierrez, 2009
†Eozygodon Tassy & Pickford, 1983
†Zygolophodon Vacek, 1877
†Sinomammut Mothé et al., 2016
†Mammut Blumenbach, 1799
Elephantida Tassy & Shoshani, 1997
†Choerolophodontidae Gaziry, 1976
†Afrochoerodon Pickford, 2001
†Choerolophodon Schlesinger, 1917
†Amebelodontidae Barbour, 1927
†Afromastodon Pickford, 2003
†Progomphotherium Pickford, 2003
†Eurybelodon Lambert, 2016
†Serbelodon Frick, 1933
†Archaeobelodon Tassy, 1984
†Protanancus Arambourg, 1945
†Amebelodon Barbour, 1927
†Konobelodon Lambert, 1990
†Torynobelodon Barbour, 1929
†Aphanobelodon Wang et al., 2016
†Platybelodon Borissiak, 1928
†Gomphotheriidae Hay, 1922
†Gomphotherium Burmeister, 1837
†Blancotherium May, 2019
†Gnathabelodon Barbour & Sternberg, 1935
†Eubelodon Barbour, 1914
†Stegomastodon Pohlig, 1912
†Sinomastodon Tobien et al., 1986
†Notiomastodon Cabrera, 1929
†Rhynchotherium Falconer, 1868
†Cuvieronius Osborn, 1923
Elephantoidea Gray, 1821
†Anancidae Hay, 1922
†Anancus Aymard, 1855
†Morrillia Osborn, 1924
†Paratetralophodon Tassy, 1983
†Pediolophodon Lambert, 2007
†Tetralophodon Falconer, 1857
†Stegodontidae Osborn, 1918
†Stegolophodon Schlesinger, 1917
†Stegodon Falconer, 1857
Elephantidae Gray, 1821
†Stegotetrabelodontinae Aguirre, 1969
†Stegodibelodon Coppens, 1972
†Stegotetrabelodon Petrocchi, 1941
†Selenotherium Mackaye, Brunet & Tassy, 2005
Elephantinae Gray, 1821
†Primelephas Maglio, 1970
Loxodonta Anonymous, 1827
†Palaeoloxodon Matsumoto, 1924
†Mammuthus Brookes, 1828
Elephas Linnaeus, 1758

References

Bibliography
 
 

 
Mammal orders
Selandian first appearances
Taxa named by Johann Karl Wilhelm Illiger
Extant Selandian first appearances